Leonardo Ly Rojas (born March 14, 1985 in San Jose) is a Costa Rican  footballer who currently plays for UCR.

His ancestors came from China. His last name Ly in Chinese is 李.

Club career
Ly played with Municipal Liberia and Barrio México prior to signing with the Puerto Rico Islanders of the North American Soccer League in 2011. He made his NASL debut on April 9, 2011 in a game against the Carolina RailHawks. He returned to Costa Rica to play for San Carlos but was released in November 2012. Nowadays he works a s a physical education teacher for Centro Educativo Nueva Generación.

References

External links
 2010-2012 league stats - Nación
 Puerto Rico Islanders bio
 

1985 births
Living people
Costa Rican people of Chinese descent
Footballers from San José, Costa Rica
Association football midfielders
Costa Rican footballers
Municipal Liberia footballers
Puerto Rico Islanders players
A.D. San Carlos footballers
C.F. Universidad de Costa Rica footballers
Costa Rican expatriate footballers
Expatriate footballers in Puerto Rico
North American Soccer League players